The Gaudiya Mission is a Gaudiya Vaishnava monastic and missionary organization whose founder acharya is Srila Prabhupad (6 Feb 1874 — 3 Jan 1937) alias Srimad Bhakti Siddhanta Sarasvati Goswami Maharaja. The organisation has been registered since March 1940 in Calcutta, British India under the supervision of the then Acharya Srila Acharyadev (25 Aug 1895 — 8 March 1958) alias Srimad Bhakti Prasad Puri Goswami Maharaj after accepting sannyasa in 1939/1941.

History

The Gaudiya Mission is the government registered name of Sri Gaudiya Math, a famous organization that existed from 1920 to 1937. Bhaktisiddhanta Sarasvati selected Ananta Vasudev Prabhu as his successor, but sadly after Prabhupad disappeared and the positive decision of the Sri Gaudiya Math's leaders about Ananta Vasudev Prabhu as a new acharya, Kuñjabihari Vidyabusana (Kunja Babu), the secretary and the president of the Gaudiya Math did not agree with the decision and separated his own branch (the "Sri Chaitanya Math" branch in Mayapur). Thus, Ananta Vasudev Prabhu later gave up his post of successor and was forced to establish a new organization (de facto renamed the Gaudiya Math) became known as the Gaudiya Mission. The 64 Gaudiya Math centers were divided into two groups in 1948 and Gaudiya Mission kept the central temple "Sri Gaudiya Math" with museum at Bagbazar in Kolkata, the headquarter of Mission up to the present day.

Later Ananta Vasudev Prabhu started to criticize some of the teachings of Bhaktisiddhanta Sarasvati (particularly, counted the proselytizing work as not the true spirituality), married, settled in Vrindavan, joined the "Babajis" and translated into Bengali 62 paper of the six Goswamis of Vrindavana, classical Gaudiya Vaishnava works. After him, the mission was headed by Bhakti Keval Audulaumi (from 1953 to 1982). Next acharyas became Bhakti Srirup Bhagavat (1982—1993) and Bhakti Suhrid Paribrajak (1993—2018). The present acharya is Bhakti Sundar Sanyasi Maharaj.

Current status
Main posts and organs of mission are President-Acharya, President, Governing Body and Council Body. It has 26 temples in India, UK (London, "Sri Vasudev Gaudiya Math" estd. 1933), and US (New York, "Sri Bhakti Srirup Bhagawat Gaudiya Math" estd. 2007). Approximately has a total of 60 sannyasis. Created medical services and dispensaries. It is publishing a monthly magazine"Bhakti Patra".

Notes

References

Bibliography

External links 
 

Gaudiya Vaishnavism
Hindu organizations
Hindu organisations based in India
Hinduism in Kolkata
Hinduism in the United Kingdom
Hindu religious orders
Organisations based in Kolkata
Religious organizations established in 1940
1940 establishments in British India